The  is a Japanese international school in the El Plantío area of Moncloa-Aravaca, Madrid, in the city's northwestern portion. Many Japanese families, particularly those with children, live in northwest Madrid, in proximity to the school. It was established on 1 September 1981 (Shōwa 56).

The Escuela Complementaria Japonesa de Madrid (ECJ; マドリッド補習授業校 Madoriddo Hoshū Jugyō Kō), a Japanese supplementary school, is a part of the CJM. The ECJ was merged into the Madrid Japanese School in April 1996 (Heisei Year 8).

As of 2011 the day school had fewer than 30 students, and as of 2012 it had 28 students. It gives progress evaluations to students, ranked 1 through 5, taking into account the students' maturity levels. It does not use suspensions or recoveries. Students who are higher performing help those who need assistance.

See also

 Japan–Spain relations
 Japanese people in Spain
 Japanese School in Barcelona

References

External links

 Colegio Japonés de Madrid 
 Escuela Complementaria Japonesa de Madrid 
 Escuela Complementaria Japonesa de Madrid  (Archive)
 "【Finalizado】Presentación del programa del nuevo año académico 2015 del Colegio Japonés de Madrid". Esjapon.com, ZIPANGO, S.L. 19 January 2015.

International schools in Madrid
Madrid
Madrid
Private schools in Spain
Madrid
1981 establishments in Spain
Educational institutions established in 1981